The East Kilbride Pirates are an American Football team based in Glasgow, Scotland, who compete in the BAFA National Leagues Premier North, the highest level of British American football. The club although formed in East Kilbride currently operate in Glasgow and play their home games at Braidholm. They are both the most successful and the oldest surviving American Football team in Scotland having been formed in 1985. The club has won Division 1 National titles in 2011 and 2022 and are eleven-time Divisional champions.

History

Formation (1985)
The East Kilbride Pirates were formed in 1985, following a notice appearing in the local newspaper asking any interested parties to attend training. The club was named in a competition through the local newspaper, the East Kilbride News. 1985 was a formative year, and the club played three unkitted games, winning 2 and losing 1.

Early  years (1985–1995)
For the 1986 season, the Pirates merged with the nearby Rutherglen Ironhogs, producing a suitably sized squad to take part in the British American Football League (Anglo Conference). Things started brightly under head coach, Steve Gulley, a player with the club, as a 13–0 win was recorded over the Clydesdale Colts in the first kitted game. Unfortunately, this was to be the last win of the year, as the team ended up with a 1–6 record.

1987 saw a new head coach with the appointment of Bill Walsh, an American working in East Kilbride. Walsh's influence was apparent as East Kilbride went 4–4 to finish second in Division One of the new, Budweiser American Football League.

With Coach Walsh's return to the States, a new head coach was appointed in 1988. Another American, Nick Fantini, was in town on a 12-month exchange visit, and he agreed to take over the reins during his stay. Unfortunately for both Fantini and the club, the previous year's success had resulted in promotion to the Premier Division of the Budweiser League. The higher standard of football quickly became obvious, as the Pirates tumbled to a 0–10 season. Included in those 10 losses was a 110–0 defeat at the Granite City Oilers. To date this is still the second heaviest defeat suffered in domestic American Football games in the United Kingdom (only Mersey Centurions 148–6 defeat of Halton Demons in a 1989 BNGL game was more emphatic).

Nick returned home after this season, but he was to return later. The head coach's cap was passed to Alastair Rodger, a Scottish coach who had previously worked with the Clydesdale Colts. Another change in the league set-up saw the club compete in the Combined Gridiron League (Premier Division) in 1989.

1990 saw the arrival of the British National Gridiron League. The Pirates had a 0–9 season, but this year was to be remembered for all the wrong reasons. During a game at the Dundee Whalers, Pirates' linebacker Kenny Hodge received injuries from which he later died. This was the first ever fatality in American Football in Britain, and if any good can come from such a set of circumstances, then the tightening up of player insurance and ambulance cover which followed was one such benefit. After much soul searching within the club, the Pirates decided to carry on. The Player of the Year Award was renamed in Kenny's memory.

1991 saw the return of Nick Fantini as head coach, with Nick having returned to Scotland. A 3–5–1 season ensued, but the club was again rocked by the loss of another player. Cornerback Barry Nunn died from a congenital heart disease, and although his death was not football related, the loss was just as great. A new Most Improved Player Award was created to commemorate Barry.

In 1992, with the team still in the BNGL National Division, things started to improve on the field. A then Club record 44–0 win over the now defunct Glasgow Cyclones, and a 34–12 victory at Granite City Oilers being two of the main highlights in a 5–5 year.

On to 1993, and the BNGL Premier Division. Last year's progress continued, and a first ever winning season of 7–3 was recorded. Highlights included a nail-biting win at the Edinburgh Eagles to clinch a playoff spot. Involvement in the playoffs was short, with a heavy defeat in England at the hands of a very strong Lancashire Wolverines side.

The BAFA Senior League arrived in 1994, with East Kilbride in Division 2. In an attempt to improve their standing, the Club arranged to import an American quarterback, Craig Van Ness. Unfortunately, Craig damaged his knee in a skiing accident just before coming to Scotland and was not able to do himself justice. After a month here, he returned to the States. Dunoon based QB, Graeme Henry took over and steered the team to a record of 4–4 in a season shortened by other Clubs failing to fulfill their fixtures.

The Scottish Gridiron Association (1995–1998)
The 1995 Season was the first of the independent Scottish Gridiron Association, and the Pirates finished as Conference Champions with a 6–3–1 record. A loss at Dundee was overturned by League officials and the game awarded to East Kilbride after the Whalers were found guilty of fielding ineligible players. The 6 wins also included an awarded victory over Denny Broncos and an unfulfilled fixture at Granite City was declared a tie. Despite falling at the first hurdle in the playoffs, this was a highly successful year considering the small squad used. An unprecedented number of injuries compounded the problem, but with many players playing both ways, a difficult year was completed with some success.

Following this relative success, a number of veteran players announced their retirement. Their places were filled by no fewer than 6 of the Junior squad who moved up to join the Seniors, in addition to the new players recruited from Rookie Trials. This left a very inexperienced squad, and despite the late addition of a number of players from the Clydesdale Colts, who were "taking a year out" (but never returned) during 1996, a disappointing Season followed. The Pirates finished with a 2–7 record.

For 1997, East Kilbride lost the services of the former Colts, but these players were more than replaced by the arrival of a significant number of Glasgow Lions players following the demise of what was Scotland's leading Club. The inclusion of both their playing ability and coaching knowledge was a huge benefit to the Pirates who proceeded to go throughout the 1997 Season unbeaten to capture their first Scottish Title. (SGA Bowl III at Caird Park, Dundee)

The Pirates retained their SGA Title in 1998, defeating Dundee Whalers in the Bowl game, just as they had done 12 months earlier. (SGA Bowl IV at Loch Inch, Glasgow)

Return to British competition (1999–2004)
1999 saw the Pirates return to the British Senior League, where only they and the Strathclyde Sheriffs represented Scotland. While the Sheriffs competed in Division 2, East Kilbride were thrown in at the deep end, as part of Division 1's National Conference. A mixed season followed, with the Pirates winning three of the seven games actually played. This, along with an awarded game saw the Club finish with a 4–4 record, and miss a place in the Bowl game by the narrowest of margins.

2000 saw the BSL realign Division 1, with the Pirates being moved into the Northern Conference. After a slow start, the Pirates went on a long unbeaten run, which only ended in the Play-off Semi Finals. Despite finishing the regular season with a 6–2 record, the lack of home field advantage proved too big an obstacle to overcome.

Another year, another step forward with the Pirates  reaching Britbowl 2001 at Don Valley Stadium in Sheffield. The title of Northern Conference Champions was also picked up along the way. What was initially expected to be a rebuilding year exceeded all expectations. The "void" game against Cheshire came about following a serious accident to one of the Romans' players on the eve of the game (thankfully he recovered fully). Also, the away game at Nottingham scheduled for 15 July was conceded by the Caesars.

2002 again saw several changes in personnel and the average age of the side dropped even further. However, the quality of incoming players was again very high. An unbeaten regular season saw the Pirates finish as the Number One ranked side in Division 1. The scheduled first round of the playoffs should have been vs the Chester Romans but the Romans conceded the fixture. The much anticipated semi-final against the PA Knights was played during torrential rain in a mudbath at Brancumhall, and it was the visitors who came out on top after an almighty struggle.

The Pirates made it all the way to the Final again in 2003, again going undefeated in the regular season. The game at Lancashire was postponed twice before eventually being declared a "tie". The play-offs saw a narrow win over Ipswich before again losing out to London O's in Britbowl 2003 in Sheffield.

The 2004 campaign came on the back of what many saw as a "winter of discontent". Several players left for a variety of reasons and a new squad was assembled under the leadership of James Dougall who was appointed as head coach. An affiliation was also put in place with Clyde Valley Hawks youth team to hopefully ensure a flow of players into the club in future years. The League introduced a Division 1A, with inter-conference games between Div. 1 and 1A teams. The games against Chester Romans (H) and Lancashire Wolverines (A) were awarded to East Kilbride as 1–0 wins. Play-off participation ended swiftly at the hands of old nemesis, the London O's.

Rebuilding years (2005–2010)

2005 saw the Pirates relinquish the Northern Conference title that they had won in the four preceding seasons. Losses in the two opening away games left a mountain to climb, and while the team did qualify for the play-offs with a 6–4 record, it would have been foolhardy to send a small and inexperienced squad to face the London Olympians (formerly the O's). Thus, the game was forfeited.

The 2006 season saw another influx of young players for The Pirates, from the nearby Youth and University league teams. They started poorly, recording only one win from their first four games, largely due to a season-ending injury to QB Matt McCusker in the opening game at Gateshead; however the season was to turn around in emphatic fashion as Ross Templeton took the snaps and led the team on to five wins out of their remaining six fixtures. A quarter-final win after the long journey to Finsbury Park, London would have set up a much anticipated semi-final against Gateshead but despite a brave performance, The Pirates were defeated. After the close of the 2006 season, BAFL again realigned the league structure, placing the Pirates in the newly formed BAFL Premier League

2007 started off with another trip to Gateshead and a disappointing 5–0 loss to the Senators. One field goal and a safety given on a dubious foul call were all that separated the teams. In the second game, frustrations continued as the Pirates moved the ball well against the Bulls but failed to capitalise on good field positions, eventually throwing two interceptions which led to touchdowns. In the third game, after a flight to Bristol, continuous rain meant fumbles were the order of the day and the Pirates Offense were stagnant and failed again to put any points on the board. The Bristol Aztecs walked away easy winners, scoring on interceptions and their own possession. The fourth game at Crystal Palace against defending British Champions, the London Olympians was called off due to a lack of an ambulance. Game five saw the Pirates rack up their first points of the season, in a spirited  performance at Hamilton which ultimately finished in a loss. The first win of the season came in a hard-fought performance against the ailing Southern Sundevils in a rainy Hamilton Palace bottom-of-the-table clash, where the Sundevils took an early lead but were eventually outgunned by the Pirates. Game seven saw a depleted squad travel to Warwick to play Coventry and put up a spirited performance in which they outscored the jets in the second half. Unfortunately a first half rout meant it made little difference and it was another long journey home on the back of a loss for the Pirates. The final two home games of the season saw a defeat to the London Blitz, despite an early Pirates lead followed by a 19–6 win over the Gateshead Senators on a day where the score could have been much higher for the rampant Pirates. The season was completed with a 13–0 away victory over Birmingham Bulls.

The off-season prior to the 2008 campaign was unusual as the London O's were forced to pull out of the league once the schedule had been set. This meant that the northern teams lost one game and the southern teams lost two, so to even the fixtures, the Pirates also lost an away game to Coventry Jets. On their season opener, they broke a three-year opening-day curse by beating the Gateshead Senators comfortably 34–8. Game two saw a spirited performance despite a heavy loss at home to the Coventry Jets, which was followed by a crushing defeat in London at the hands of the reigning champion London Blitz. Game four saw Pirates pick up the pace again with a good win in Gateshead and this was followed by a strong victory away to the Birmingham Bulls, with a travelling squad of only 19 players, to put the Pirates second in the division. In game 6, a tough visit to Aldershot Army Stadium to play the Farnham Knights resulted in a heavy defeat, again highlighting the gulf between some teams in the Premier Division. In an all-or-nothing game seven, the Pirates played poorly and lost to the Bristol Aztecs, ending their playoff hopes. The final game was forfeited by the Bulls, giving a record of 4–4 but leaving many to question the sustainability of the Premier League. Running concurrently to the kitted league, the Pirates also entered a team into the inaugural BAFA Adult Flag contest and fared reasonably well, however it was felt by the committee and the players that flag football distracted from the team's primary aim of supporting a kitted team and so this was dissolved after 2008.

True to Pirates recent form, more off-season drama preceded the 2009 season. The BAFL decided that due to a number of factors (namely London O's dropping out of the Premier Division prior to the '08 season and both Gateshead and Birmingham failing to complete their fixtures) they would reduce the Premier Division to six teams for 2009. These six teams would be the five teams who completed their '08 Premier fixtures, as well as the newly promoted Sussex Thunder. Due to this increase in teams based in the South of England, Pirates travelling distances were set to rocket, with the consequence that costs, too, would increase dramatically. Despite ongoing discussions, in which the Pirates outlined the problems which this would cause, the decision had been made and the Pirates had to make the regrettable move of stepping down to BAFL Division 1 North. This gave them the opportunity to regroup and find a new home with Hamilton Rugby Club. They opened their account with a 50-point demolition of nearby team the West Coast Trojans in the teams' first ever meeting. This was followed by a scrappy victory over the Dundee Hurricanes and comfortable defeats of the visiting Merseyside Nighthawks and Gateshead Senators. Their first real challenge of the season came in game 5, where they managed a two-point victory over the Yorkshire Rams; however they found another gear the following week, recording a 17-point win over the same opposition in the return leg. Their seventh game saw the team visit the second-placed Doncaster Mustangs, where they won 42–22 and clinched their conference title for the first time since 2004. Game eight was cancelled as the Trojans were unable to field a team, giving the Pirates a 1–0 win and in game nine, they were held to a draw by the Dundee Hurricanes after backup Quarterback Darren Brownlie suffered a broken collar bone. In the final game of the regular season, the Pirates visited old rivals the Gateshead Senators and fell to a 7–6 loss after a dismal offensive performance. They turned this result around the following week to beat the Senators and book their place in the British Semi Final. Here they beat the Tamworth Phoenix in an impressive 25–0 sweep, before losing to the London Cobras at Britbowl.

The Pirates once again competed in the Division 1 North in the 2010 season. This time around, they completed a clean sweep of the regular season with a 10–0 record, conceding less than 6 points per game and scoring over 35. They finished the season with the overall #1 ranking in the UK among Division 1 teams, thereby securing home field advantage throughout the playoffs at their new home ground of Whitecraigs Rugby Club, Newton Mearns. In the playoffs they won a close battle with Division 1 newcomers the Leicester Falcons, before securing their place in a second successive final with a victory over the Ipswich Cardinals. In the final, held at Worcester Warriors Sixways Stadium, they fell to a very strong performance from the team they beat in the previous years semi-final, the Tamworth Phoenix. Despite the disappointment, it was another strong season as the team celebrated their 25th anniversary. Two weeks after the conclusion of the season, the Pirates launched their first Youth and Junior team setup since 1998 and Chairman Matthew Davies announced that he would step down in January, after three and a half years leading the club. At the team's AGM, Amanda McDonald was voted in as his replacement, the first time a woman had led a Scottish senior American Football team.

Division One (2011)

The quest for the Division 1 North title began again in 2011 and with the exception of an away loss to the Doncaster Mustangs, where starting QB Ryan Hunter was unavailable and his replacement Neil Baptie had his collarbone broken by a jarring hit early on, the Pirates sailed through the regular season with a 9–1 record. The playoffs saw a home game against the Yorkshire Rams where EK, followed by a visit to old rivals the Birmingham Bulls, who the Pirates dispatched with a 47–27 scoreline to book their third consecutive finals place. The event, held at Crystal Palace, London, was expected to go the way of the Leicester Falcons (who the Pirates narrowly defeated, 22–20 in the 2010 Quarter Final), but the Pirates came out of the blocks firing and scored TDs on each of their first six possessions, racking up a 42–0 half time lead. The second half was a closer affair, but the Falcons never looked close to making up the ground, eventually succumbing by a scoreline of 62–23 and handing the Pirates their first ever National Championship.

Back in the Premier Division (2012–2018) 

With BAFANL opting to move from a single 6-team Premier to a split 6 North/6 South Premier for the 2012 season, The Pirates were places in the Northern conference, alongside the Yorkshire Rams, Doncaster Mustangs, Leicester Falcons, Tamworth Phoenix and Birmingham Bulls. The season was successful on the field for the team, but a number of the other Northern teams had significant problems, leading 4 games being cancelled (Doncaster away, both Leicester fixtures and Birmingham at home). The Pirates went 5–1 on the field (9–1 when forfeits were added in) and topped the conference, earning a bye into the semi final. The London Blitz travelled up to play the Pirates in their fourth ever meeting and the night before the game, their bus was set robbed and on fire! On the day, the pirates took a 7–0 lead, before falling 14–7 behind and then regaining a 17–14 lead in the 4th quarter. With only minutes to go, the Blitz took a 21–17 lead and the Pirates, whilst driving down the field, fumbled the ball away on their final possession, allowing the Blitz to kneel out the game. Despite the setback, it was a strong showing and proof that the Pirates were a good fit in the Premier Division.

At the conclusion of the 2012 season, it was announced that there would be another restructure of the top flight, expanding each side of the Premier Division to 11-team Conferences. Each team is scheduled to play the others in its conference once; 5 home and 5 away. This will see the Pirates face an opponent for the first time (Sheffield Predators) as well as continuing their rivalries with the Mustangs, Rams, Bulls and Phoenix, playing the Lancashire Wolverines for the first time since 2004, the Nottinghams Caesars for the first time in seven years and the Coventry Jets (who the Pirates have never beaten) for the first time since 2008. They will also face Scottish opposition (West Coast Trojans) for the first time since 2009.

East Kilbride had another strong campaign in 2013, powering through the schedule without loss, racking up only their third perfect 10–0 season in history (but the second in four seasons and only the second in the top flight), including two comprehensive victories over the local West Coast Trojans, extending the record to 17 seasons without loss to another Scottish team. The team performed well in poor conditions in the Semi Final to record their first ever win against the Bristol Aztecs, but in a repeat of the previous year's semi-final, they again fell to the London Blitz by 4 points, despite having their chances to win. The Blitz finally lost their title to the London Warriors.

The 2014 season started with a 72–0 whitewash of Gateshead Senators, with the Pirates notching up their biggest win since 2011, followed by a 41–0 victory away to Sheffield. The strong results continued (despite forfeits from Yorkshire Rams and Doncaster Mustangs) and the Pirates were 8–0, going into the final game of the regular season, away to Tamworth Phoenix. The game was streamed online and hundreds of viewers saw EKP win a nailbiter 14–7 and claim their fifth conference title in a row, along with home field advantage throughout the playoffs. Two weeks later, they hosted the London Olympians in the Quarter Finals (a team the Pirates had never beaten in six attempts) and dismantled them by a score of 52–18. The following week saw a rematch of the last two semi finals, with the London Blitz travelling up to take on the Pirates for a spot at Britbowl.

2015 saw the Pirates lose two regular season games for the first time since 2008, to Lancashire Wolverines and Tamworth Phoenix, but they turned both results around in the second meetings and managed to do so with a good enough points difference to claim the #1 spot in the North for the seventh year running. With a new format and no Quarter Finals this year, the team hosted the London Blitz for the fourth year in a row in the British Semi Finals and for the fourth year in a row they came off worse, losing 19–7 in a nail biter where the visitors scored on a pass, a punt return and a strip returned for a TD.

The 2016 season saw the Pirates lose four regular season games, lose the northern champions crown and fail to qualify for playoffs for the first time in eight years. The retirement of many long-time players, coupled with an influx of new players had led to the challenge of a larger, but less experienced squad. The off-season saw refocusing for the team and 2017 sees the first wholsale graduation of members the club's junior team to play senior football, with six junior graduates stepping up to adult football.

Another disappointing season followed in 2017 which finished 4-5-1 and again saw the team miss out of playoff action. Following a disappointing start to the 2018 campaign including a historic loss against Scottish rivals the Edinburgh Wolves, the team parted ways with head coach Ross Templeton after the third game of the season, replacing him with former vetern player and junior offensive coordinator Jamie McLaughlin.  Despite this, the team went winless for the rest of the season and were relegated to Division 1.

Rebuilding (2019–)

Season Record

Youth and Junior Teams
East Kilbride Pirates Youth

In 2010, after an absence of 12 years, Youth Kitted American Football returned to East Kilbride in the form of the EK Pirates Youth team for players aged 14–16. They competed in the BAFANL Youth league in 2011 and won their first tournament, but ultimately missed the playoffs. In their second year, they continued their development, but again fell short of playoff contention. That year saw their first youth player graduate to the local Lanarkshire Longhorns Junior side. In 2014, they qualified for BritBowl for the first time, travelling down to Doncaster and beating the UK #1 seed in their first game, before losing out in double overtime in the semi-final. In 2015, they again qualified for the Semi Finals and completed their regular season fixtures by beating the dominant Highland Wildcats for the first time in their history.

In 2016, the Pirates youth team continued to extend their dominance by finishing as overall Scottish Champions, knocking the Highland Wildcats off the top spot for the first time in over five years and qualifying for u17s British Finals in Sheffield on Saturday 3 September. The Pirates went on to sail through each round of the finals, culminating in a championship final win against Cobham Cougars that saw the Pirates take the u17s British Championship title. Jack Cochrane was named as youth BritBowl MVP. The scores were as follows:

Quarter-final – East Kilbride Pirates 16 v 8 Birmingham Bulls
Semi-final – Chester Romans 13 v 25 East Kilbride Pirates
National Championship Final: East Kilbride Pirates 37 v 6 Cobham Cougars

The Pirates Youth made the final again in 2017, this time narrowly losing out to the Cougars.

The Pirates won their Second youth National Championship in 2018 with running back Mathew Black being the MVP in the final, the results were as follows:
Quarter-Finals: Kent Exiles 14-26 Pirates, Semi-Finals: Leeds Academy Assassins 13-27 Pirates: National Championship Game: Chorley Buccaneers 22-51 Pirates

The Hamilton Buccaneers

In 2012, the Pirates increased their coverage in Lanarkshire by creating a second Youth team, the Hamilton Buccaneers. The Bucs have continued to grow, consistently finishing #3 in the Scottish youth conference, and in 2017 launched the club's first youth flag endeavor.

East Kilbride Pirates Junior

In mid 2013, the team announced plans for a Junior team, to compete in the 16–19 age range and bridge the gap between Youth and Senior. They played their first season in 2014 with a small squad, recording 2 wins, however a good graduating class from the two youth teams boosted the 2015 playing squad and the team won two games before finishing their season by winning a friendly against Clackmannanshire Ravens in the off-season after a change of coaching staff once the season had ended. Further additions from the two Youth teams and an expansion of the coaching staff boosted the squad and in 2016 they went on to become Scottish Champions, Northern Champions and British u19s championship runners-up.

In 2017 the team repeated this achievement, narrowly losing in the British Final to the London Blitz, in the highest scoring Junior final in British history. This made the Pirates the first Scottish team ever to appear in more than one British Championship game.

In 2018 the junior team went 5–1 in the regular season, and narrowly lost out to Manchester Titans in the semi-final, in a game that went to overtime. The team went on to compete in the National Plate final, winning the championship 46–0 against Herfordshire Cheetahs.

In 2019, despite having the team's youngest and most inexperienced squad to date, the team finished their regular season 6–0, and won a semi-final 13–9 against Birmingham Lions to qualify for their third appearance at the British U19 final in four years. The game was streamed by BBC Sport, and despite strong hopes the Scots were shut out 26–0 against a fast and physical London Blitz junior team.

Women's teams
In September 2015 the East Kilbride Pirates launched their first women's team. The call for players met with a positive local response and the team competed in the British American Football Association's Opal Series flag competition for women. The Pirates women's team compete in the Opal flag and Sapphire kitted competitions.

In 2017 the women's section split into distinct contact and flag teams. In 2018 the club appointed Claire Cochrane as their first ever female head coach to lead the women's contact team.

In 2019 the women's flag team finished 3rd in the UK Opal Series. The highest positioning in their history.

In 2020 the women's flag team lifted the 1st-place trophy for the first women's bracket at the Flagging New Year tournament.

References

External links
East Kilbride Pirates Official Site

BAFA National League teams
American football teams in Scotland
East Kilbride
Sport in South Lanarkshire
Hamilton, South Lanarkshire
1985 establishments in Scotland
American football teams established in 1985